Little Britain: The Video Game is a collection of mini-games by British studios Gamerholix and Gamesauce and published by Mastertronic Group under their Blast! Entertainment label. It is presented in the format of an episode from the TV show. Players can interact with the sketch show characters in a series of seven mini-games featuring Lou and Andy, Vicky Pollard, Emily and Florence, Marjorie Dawes, Daffyd Thomas, Judy & Maggie and Letty. Each mini game plays like a sketch from the TV show and to win the game, the player must progress through all the sketches to the end of the show, where the credits will roll. The game's reception was incredibly negative, and has appeared on many lists as one of the worst games ever made.

Development
The game was announced by publisher Blast! Entertainment in November 2006. The shows creators and main cast of the show, Matt Lucas and David Walliams were announced to provided the voices for the game, with Walliams also said to be working on the game's script.

Platforms
Little Britain: The Video Game is available for PC, PS2 and PSP. The PC version has a variation on the title and is called Little Britain: The Computer Game. This is the only difference between platforms. The PSP version is entirely different from the PC & PS2 versions of the game, as it allows wireless multiplayer with the PSP's WLAN function and the ability to stream demos of the game to other users. It also features a bonus mini game featuring Anne & a new game for Emily.

Reception

The game was universally panned, holding a 1.6/10 on GameSpot UK based on seven reviews. With a score of 16% and 11.67%, for the PS2 and PC version respectively, on GameRankings, it is the second lowest rated game on the site, surpassed only by Big Rigs: Over the Road Racing.

In his review of the PS2 version for Eurogamer, James Lyon called the game "Absolutely appalling" and that each an every one of the minigames was "awful". He went on to conclude that the game was "badly animated, graphically poor, and should shame all who made it and all who buy it." Writing in PALGN Neville Nicholson said it was "possibly the worst licensed game in the history of mankind" and that the "English language is insufficient to fully describe the atrocities this game comprises."

References

External links
 
 

2007 video games
Extreme sports video games
Little Britain
PlayStation 2 games
Windows games
Video games based on television series
Video games developed in the United Kingdom
PlayStation Portable games
Multiplayer and single-player video games